Klaus Schmitt (born 1940 in Rimbach/Odenwald, Germany) is an American mathematician doing research in nonlinear differential equations, and nonlinear analysis.

Schmitt completed the Abitur at Rimbach's Martin-Luther-Schule in 1960.  He received a BA in mathematics and physics from St. Olaf College in 1962, an MA (1964) and PhD in mathematics from the University of Nebraska in 1967.  He began his 43-year career at the University of Utah in 1967, first as assistant, then associate, then as full professor of mathematics.  He also served as chairman of the department of mathematics from 1989 to 1992.

Schmitt served short-term appointments as visiting professor at the University of Würzburg,  University of Karlsruhe, University of Stuttgart, University Catholique de Louvain, University of Bremen, Technical University of Berlin, University of Heidelberg, University of Kaiserslautern, University of Sydney, Universidad de Chile, Universidad Catolica de Chile, National Chengchi University in Taiwan, National Tsing Hua University in Taiwan and the Chern Institute of Mathematics in Tianjin, China.

He has served as professor emeritus of mathematics at the University of Utah since 2010.

Schmitt was awarded the Humboldt Prize in mathematics in 1978 and was honored as a University of Nebraska Distinguished Alumnus in 2000.

Selected Publications 

 Boundary value problems for quasilinear elliptic partial differential equations, Nonl. Anal., 2(1978), 263-309.
 Nonlinear elliptic boundary value problems versus their finite difference approximations: Numerically irrelevant solutions (with H.O. Peitgen and D. Saupe), J. Reine Angew. Mathematik, 322(1981), 74-117.
 Global analysis of elliptic two parameter eigenvalue problems (with H.O. Peitgen), Trans. Amer. Math. Soc., 283(1984), 57-95.
 Global aspects of the discrete and continuous Newton method: A case study (with H.O. Peitgen and M. Prüfer), Acta Appl. Math., 13(l988), 123-202.
 On positive solutions of semilinear elliptic equations (with E.N. Dancer), Proc. Amer. Math. Soc., 101(1987), 445-452.
 Permanence and dynamics in biological systems (with V. Hutson), Math. Biosciences, 111(1992), 1-71.
 Landesman-Lazer type problems at an eigenvalue of odd multiplicity (with J. Mawhin), Results in Math. 14 (1988), 138-146.
 Positive solutions and conjugate points for systems of differential equations (with H. Smith), Nonlinear Analysis: Theory, Methods & Applications, 2 (1978), 93-105.
 Asymptotic behavior of positive solution branches of semilinear elliptic problems with linear part at resonance (with R. Schaaf), Z. Angew. Mathematik und Physik, 43(1992), 645-676.
 Minimization problems for noncoercive functionals subject to constraints (with V. K. Le), Trans. Amer. Math. Soc., 347(1995), 4485-4513.
 Global Bifurcation in Variational Inequalities: Applications to Obstacle and Unilateral Problems (with L. K. Vy), vol 123, Applied Math. Sciences, Springer Verlag, New York, 1997.
 Mountain pass type solutions of quasilinear elliptic equations (with P. Clément, M. García-Huidobro, and R. Manásevich), Calculus of Variations and PDE, 11(2000), 33-62.
 On the existence of soliton solutions to quasilinear Schrödinger equations (with M. Poppenberg and Z. Wang), Calculus of Variations and PDE, 14(2002), 329–344.
 The Liouville-Bratu-Gelfand problem for radial operators (with J. Jacobsen), J. Differential Equations, 184(2002), 283–298.
 On principal eigenvalues for quasilinear elliptic differential operators: an Orlicz-Sobolev space setting (with M. García-Huidobro, V. Le, R. Manásevich), Nonlinear Differential Equations and Applications NoDEA 6 (1999), 207–225.
 Radial solutions of quasilinear elliptic equations (with J. Jacobsen), pp. 359–435 in Handbook on Differential Equations, Canada, Drabek, Fonda, editors. Elsevier, Amsterdam, 2004.

References

University of Nebraska alumni
Living people
University of Utah people
St. Olaf College alumni
1940 births